University Alliance Online (US) The University Alliance Online facilitates the promotion and online delivery of associate's, bachelor's and master's degrees as well as professional certificate programs from the nation's leading traditional universities and institutions. Powered by University Alliance's technology and support services, its university partners have surpassed 750,000 online enrollments – making University Alliance the largest facilitator of e-learning in the country.

University partners include Villanova University, the University of Notre Dame's Mendoza College of Business, Michigan State University, the University of San Francisco, the University of Vermont, Florida Institute of Technology, The University of Scranton, Jacksonville University, Dominican University, and New England College.

University Alliance Online is a division of Bisk Education, Inc. of Tampa, Florida.

Degree Programs Online
Associate's, bachelor's and master's degree programs in the following disciplines are available online through University Alliance:

 Accounting
 Applied Psychology
 Business Administration
 Criminal Justice
 Computer Information Systems
 Cybersecurity
 Finance
 Healthcare Management
 Human Resources Management
 Information Assurance & Cybersecurity
 Information Technology Management
 Internet Marketing
 Liberal Arts
 Nursing
 Marketing
 Project Management
 Public Administration
 Supply Chain Management

Professional Certificate Programs Online
Certificate programs in the following disciplines are available online through University Alliance:

 Business Administration
 Business Analysis
 Business Intelligence
 Business Process Management
 Contract Management
 Campus Sustainable Innovation
 Hospitality Management
 Human Resources
 Intercultural Management 
 Internet Marketing
 IS Security
 ITIL 
 Leadership and Management
 Negotiation
 Project Management
 ROI Methodology
 Sales & Sales Management
 Six Sigma
 Software Testing
 Supply Chain Management
 Sustainable Innovation

References
Nathan Bisk - Founder of Bisk Education & University Alliance

External links
 Official University Alliance website
 Official Bisk Education, Inc. website

Universities and colleges in the United States